Handsome Boy may refer to:
 A fictional modeling boy in the Vidhya mandir -Harsh Aswani Get a Life.
Handsome Boy, an album by Japanese singer-songwriter Yosui Inoue, released in 1990
Handsome Boy Records, a Canadian independent record label in the 1990s
 Handsome Boy Modeling School, a musical project consisting of hip-hop producers Prince Paul and Dan the Automator